Ashok Nagar Pokhriya is one of the oldest societies in Begusarai, the administrative headquarters of Begusarai District, Bihar state, India.

Ashok Nagar Pokhriya was once dominated by the Bhumihar caste by bahubali in the late 1980's
Shri Kailash Singh known as Kailash babu.

Begusarai